Arthur Raymond Hall (June 4, 1869 – December 4, 1955) was an American football player and coach. He served as head football coach at the University of Illinois at Urbana–Champaign in 1904—along with Justa Lindgren, Fred Lowenthal, and Clyde Matthews—and alone from 1907 to 1912, compiling a record of 36–12–4. Hall was the first man to coach the Fighting Illini for longer than five seasons, leading them to the Big Ten Conference championship in 1910.

He was born in Tonica, Illinois in 1869 and died at East Lynn, Illinois in 1955.

Head coaching record

References

External links
 

1869 births
1955 deaths
19th-century players of American football
American football ends
Illinois Fighting Illini football coaches
Illinois Fighting Illini football players
People from Tonica, Illinois